Channa pulchra is a species of snakehead fish in the family Channidae which is native to Myanmar. It was first described in 2007 by R. Britz from a specimen collected from the Kyeintali Chaung (stream) basin in Rakhine Yoma, western Myanmar. The fish is found in streams that are fast flowing, clear, highly oxygenated and relatively cold (subtropical). It is of little food value but getting popularity as an aquarium fish recently.

C. pulchra is closely related to C. ornatipinnis and C. stiktos.

References 

pulchra
Taxa named by Ralf Britz
Freshwater fish
Fish described in 2007